The  is a safari park in Himeji, Hyōgo, Japan. The park opened in March 1984, and is the only safari park in Kansai region. It has a "sister park" agreement with Nairobi National Park, Kenya. The park also incorporates an amusement park.

Safari park
Drive-through safari
Cheetah Section
Lion Section
Tiger Section
Herbivore Section A: Somali Giraffes, Sitatungas, etc.
Herbivore Section B: Himalayan Tahrs, Bharals, etc.
Herbivore Section C: Hippopotamuses, American Bisons, etc.
Zebra Section: Grevy's Zebras, etc.
Larger Herbivore Section: White Rhinoceroses, African Bush Elephants, etc.
Walking Safari
Child's Farm
Walking Avenue: White lions, White tigers, etc.
Kangaroo Park
1st Flying Cage
2nd Flying Cage
Bear Park
Monkey Mountain
Elephant Kingdom
Sky Safari

Amusement park
Free Fall
Giant Peter: Ferris wheel
Diavlo
Buster Bomb
Aquaria: Swimming pool, summer season only.
Ice Park: Ice rink, winter season only.
and Others.

Sky Safari
There is an aerial lift inside the safari park called . Opened in 2003, this is the only aerial lift in Japan that was built to watch animals. Three cabins are attached to transport more passengers at once.

Basic data
System: Gondola lift, 1 cable
Distance: 
Vertical interval: 
Operational speed: 4.0 m/s
Passenger capacity per a cabin: 12
36 per 3 cabins.
Cabins: 2 groups of 3 cabins
Stations: 2
Duration of one-way trip: 3 minutes

External links

 Official website

Safari parks
Zoos in Japan
Amusement parks in Japan
Gondola lifts in Japan
Buildings and structures in Himeji
Swimming venues in Japan
Tourist attractions in Himeji
1984 establishments in Japan
Zoos established in 1984
Amusement parks opened in 1984